Qeshm is an island in the Persian Gulf.

Qeshm may also refer to:
Qeshm, Hormozgan, a city on the island
Qeshm, Kurdistan, a village in Kurdistan Province
Qeshm County, an administrative subdivision of Iran
Qeshm Air
Qeshm Airport
Qeshm Institute of Higher Education